USS Providence was a sloop-of-war in the Continental Navy, originally chartered by the Rhode Island General Assembly as Katy.  The ship took part in a number of campaigns during the first half of the American Revolutionary War before being destroyed by her own crew in 1779 to prevent her falling into the hands of the British after the failed Penobscot Expedition.

Service as Katy

From early 1775, Royal Navy warships, in particular the post ship , carried out anti-smuggling operations off the New England coast. They frequently searched Rhode Island merchant shipping, annoying the colony's merchants. On 13 June, Deputy Governor Nicholas Cooke wrote the frigate's Captain James Wallace demanding restoration of several ships which Rose had detained. Two days later, the Rhode Island General Assembly ordered the committee of safety to fit out two ships to defend the colony's shipping, and appointed a committee of three to obtain the vessels. That day, the committee chartered the sloop Katy from John Brown of Providence and the sloop Washington at the same time. The General Assembly appointed Abraham Whipple as commander of Katy, the larger ship, and made him commodore of the tiny fleet. Whipple had won fame in burning the British armed schooner Gaspee in 1772, and he captured a tender to HMS Rose before sunset that same day. Katy then cruised in Narragansett Bay through the summer protecting coastal shipping.

Gunpowder was an essential commodity, scarce in the Continental Army throughout the Revolutionary War and desperately low during the first year of the struggle for independence. Late in the summer of 1775, the shortage in Washington's army besieging Boston became so severe that he was unable to use his artillery, and his riflemen would have been unable to repel an attack had the British taken the offensive. Cooke, therefore, ordered Whipple to cruise for two weeks off Sandy Hook, New Jersey to intercept a powder-laden packet expected from London. He was then to proceed to Bermuda to capture the powder stored in the British magazine there. Katy departed Narragansett Bay on 12 September but caught no sight of the packet. Upon reaching Bermuda, Whipple learned that the powder from the magazine was already en route to Philadelphia.

Service as Providence
Katy was purchased by Rhode Island 31 October 1775, soon after she returned to Providence. Late in November, she sailed for Philadelphia carrying seamen enlisted by Commodore Esek Hopkins in New England for Continental service. She arrived on 3 December and was immediately taken into Continental service and renamed Providence.

The ships joined a squadron being formed by Congress under the command of Esek Hopkins, who was Commander in Chief of the Fleet of the United Colonies; they ordered him to sail for Chesapeake Bay on 5 January 1776 and to clear waters there of a fleet organized the previous autumn by Governor Dunmore of Virginia. These English and Tory ships had ravaged the shores of the bay and the rivers which empty into it. Once Whipple's ships had completed this task, they were to move south and clear the Carolina coast of enemy shipping, then sail North to Rhode Island to perform a similar service.

Providence and her consorts departed Philadelphia early in January but were delayed by ice and did not get to sea until 17 February. Hopkins deemed it unwise to cruise along the southern coast and led his little fleet to the Abaco Islands in the Bahamas, which they reached on 1 March and staged for a raid on New Providence. The next day, they seized two sloops on which Hopkins placed a landing party of 200 marines and 50 sailors. They advanced toward Fort Montagu which opened fire, interrupting the invaders' progress. The defenders spiked their guns and retreated to Fort Nassau. The next day, Nassau surrendered and gave the Americans the keys to the Fort. Hopkins then brought his ships into the harbor and spent two weeks loading captured munitions before heading home on 17 March.

That evening, the Americans added a brigantine and a sloop to their list of prizes, both from New York. About 1 a.m. on 6 April,  sighted , a 20-gun sloop carrying dispatches from Newport to Charleston, South Carolina. The American fleet engaged the enemy ship for 1.5 hours before she turned and fled back toward Newport. After daylight, Hopkins ordered his ships to give up the chase and headed with his fleet and prizes for New London, Connecticut, where they arrived on the 8th.

Lieutenant John Paul Jones took command of Providence on 10 May and made a voyage to New York, returning about 100 soldiers to the Continental Army whom Washington had lent to Hopkins to help man the American fleet, and Jones then hove down the ship to clean her bottom. She sailed again on 13 June, escorting Fly to Fishers Island at the entrance to Long Island Sound. He rescued a brigantine en route from the British frigate , bringing munitions from Hispaniola.

Providence next escorted a convoy of colliers to Philadelphia, arriving 1 August, and Jones received his permanent commission as captain a week later. Providence departed the Delaware Capes on the 21st to begin an independent cruise; she took the brigantine Britannia soon after and sent her into Philadelphia under a prize crew. On 1 September, daring seamanship enabled Jones to escape from the British frigate . Two days later, Providence captured the Bermudan brigantine Sea Nymph carrying sugar, rum, ginger, and oil and sent her to Philadelphia. On the 6th, Providence caught the brigantine Favourite carrying sugar from Antigua to Liverpool, but  recaptured the prize before she could reach an American port.

Turning north, Jones headed for Nova Scotia and escaped another frigate on 20 September before his raid on Canso two days later. There he recruited men to fill the vacancies created by manning his prizes, burned a British fishing schooner, sank a second, and captured a third besides a shallop which he used as a tender. Providence took several more prizes fishing near Ile Madame before riding out a severe storm. The whaler Portland surrendered to her before she returned to Narragansett Bay on 8 October.

The two ships got under way 11 November. They took the brigantine Active after ten days and the armed transport Mellish the next day, carrying winter uniforms and military supplies for the British Army. On the 16th, they captured the snow Kitty. Providence had been troubled by leaks which developed during bad weather on the cruise, so she headed back for Rhode Island and arrived at Newport two days later.

The British seized Narragansett Bay in December 1776 and Providence retired up the Providence River with other American vessels. She ran the British blockade in February 1777 under Lt. Jonathan Pitcher and put into New Bedford, then cruised to Cape Breton where she captured a transport brig loaded with stores and carrying two officers and 25 men of the British Army, besides her crew. She made two cruises on the coast under command of Captain John Peck Rathbun, and sailed from Georgetown, N.C. about mid-January 1778, again bound for New Providence in the Bahamas but this time alone. On 27 January, she spiked the guns of the fort at Nassau, taking military stores including 1,600 pounds of powder and releasing 30 American prisoners. She also captured a 16-gun British ship and recaptured five other vessels which had been brought in by the British. On 30 January, the prizes were manned and sailed away, and Providence put into New Bedford with her armed prize.

During the early part of April 1779, Providence was ordered to make a short cruise in Massachusetts Bay and along the coast of Maine. She later sailed south of Cape Cod and captured the brig , 12 guns off Sandy Hook on 7 May. She fired two broadsides and a volley of muskets during the engagement and Diligent was forced to surrender, with mast rigging and hull cut to pieces. Providence was then assigned to Commodore Saltonstall's squadron which departed Boston on 19 July 1779 and entered Penobscot Bay 25 July.

Providence was destroyed by her crew, along with other American vessels in the Penobscot River on 14 August 1779 to prevent her from falling into the hands of the British towards the end of the failed Penobscot Expedition.

Reproduction
In the early 1970s a reproduction of the Providence was constructed with a fiberglass hull and was used for youth sail training.  The ship was maintained by the Providence Maritime Heritage Foundation. The ship was commissioned by John Fitzhugh Millar who was the captain of the replica frigate Rose in the 1970s.

She was launched in 1976 and designated in 1992 as the flagship and tall ship ambassador of the state of Rhode Island. The ship was in drydock for the winter of 2015, when she was toppled and severely damaged by high winds during the January 2015 nor'easter.

Providence is currently docked in Alexandria, Virginia, under the care of the Tall Ship Providence Foundation. The ship now offers tours, sails, and educational programs to tourists and locals alike.

See also

Notes

References

External links

 Photo gallery at Naval Historical Center

Ships of the Continental Navy
Sloops of the United States Navy
1775 ships
Symbols of Rhode Island
Maritime incidents in 1779